Benitura Dam, is an earthfill dam on local river near Omerga, Osmanabad district in the state of Maharashtra in India.

Specifications

Purpose
 Irrigation

See also
 Dams in Maharashtra
 List of reservoirs and dams in India

References

Dams in Osmanabad district
Dams completed in 1994
1994 establishments in Maharashtra